The Podvodnyye Islands ( and Baburi Adasi) are a small island group off the Azerbaijan coast in the Caspian Sea.

Geography
The Podvodnyye are a cluster of islets extending for about 7 km in a NW - SE direction. The group is part of the Baku Archipelago, but it lies south of the bay.

The northernmost islet is located 0.8 km from the mainland shore. The largest islet is about 2 km in length, but very narrow.

References

External links
Shipwrecks and Ceramics- Archaeology off the Absheron coast

Islands of Azerbaijan
Islands of the Caspian Sea
Uninhabited islands of Azerbaijan